National Route 344 is a national highway of Japan connecting Yuzawa, Akita and Sakata, Yamagata in Japan, with a total length of 115 km (71.46 mi).

References

National highways in Japan
Roads in Akita Prefecture
Roads in Yamagata Prefecture